Wang Huaimin (born 1962) is a Chinese scientist specializing in distributed computing. He is the current vice-president of National University of Defense Technology and dean of its School of Computing.

Early life
Wang was born in Nanjing, Jiangsu in 1962.

Honours and awards
 November 22, 2019 Member of the Chinese Academy of Sciences (CAS)

References

1962 births
Living people
Educators from Nanjing
Scientists from Nanjing
Academic staff of the National University of Defense Technology
Members of the Chinese Academy of Sciences